Dare Art Alade (born February 9, 1982)– popularly known as Darey – is a Nigerian multi-platinum Afro R&B singer, songwriter, record producer, philanthropist, humanitarian and    entrepreneur. He is also the son of the legendary African Jazz Musician and entertainer Art Alade and the creative director of Livespot360.

Early life 

Dare (pronounced Da-Ray) Art Alade was born in Lagos to legendary Nigerian Jazz pioneer Art Alade and Olapeju Alade.Dare is the last of five children of Olapeju to Art Alade,a famous Nigerian highlife/jazz artist in the sixties and seventies. Dare, as a child, used to rummage through his father's extensive jazz collection and tag along with him to his concerts.

Dare honed his skills at an early age, singing with several choirs, including the National Troupe of Nigeria Choir and then the Cathedral Choir.  From the age 15, he began performing extensively in clubs around Lagos, Ibadan and other cities in Nigeria.  It was during one of those late night sessions he met an executive at Cool FM, a major Radio station, who appreciated his voice, and his ability to interact with his audience. The determined teenager began shuttling between Cool FM and the University of Lagos where he was studying for a degree in Music, and sang with the a cappella group The Chordwebs. During his time at Cool FM, he had the opportunity to acquire the basic knowledge of radio production and marketing.

Career
Darey has also worked as a successful radio and TV personality, appearing as a coach, judge and host on several TV shows, including Project Fame West Africa, Nigerian Idol, and The Voice Nigeria.  He is also a seasoned Master of Ceremonies, voice over artist and philanthropist.

Darey is the co-founder of Livespot360, a creative agency responsible for some of the most disruptive concerts in Nigeria. Under his creative direction, Livespot360 has organised several groundbreaking concerts and festivals in Nigeria, which have featured appearances from African and international superstars alike, including Grammy award winners Kelly Rowland, Ciara, Cardi B and global super influencer and TV personality, Kim Kardashian.

2004–06: Project Fame
Darey's big break finally came during the 2004 edition of Project Fame Academy, a well renowned Reality TV show and continent-wide talent hunt and emerged third in the contest.

2006–07: From Me 2 U

After an unfruitful record deal with Sony BMG Africa, his debut album 'From Me 2 U' hit the Nigerian market two years later on Storm Records. The album was laced with several hit singles, including 'Fuji' and 'Escalade' which enjoyed massive airplay in the Nigerian and international media. The top selling album also included the song, 'Original Naija' which was used as the theme song for the first ever edition of Big Brother Nigeria. Darey's album, 'From Me 2 U' won several awards including the Awards for Musical excellence in Nigeria (A.M.E.N) and the 2006 Channel O Music Video Awards for best R&B Video in Africa.

2008: Project Fame West Africa
In 2008, Darey spent several months as the host of a music based reality show 'Project Fame West Africa' from where he first hit continental fame in the South Africa edition in 2004.

2009: unDAREYted
Two years after the release of his successful debut album, Darey released his highly anticipated follow up entitled 'unDAREYted', on the new start up label, Soul Muzik. The album sold over 150,000 copies across Nigeria in just two months. The album features appearances by Darey's contemporaries and friends: Cobhams Asuquo (Aṣa's producer), 2face Idibia, Naeto C, 9ice, Tee-Y Mix and the up-and-coming R&B crooner, Pheel, to mention a few. The critically acclaimed work features the smash hit ballad "Not The Girl," which has been nominated for several awards and won video of the year at the 2009 Nigerian Entertainment Awards held in Washington DC.

unDAREYted caught the attention of the African American Music business legend Dick Griffey, who is credited with discovering and influencing the music careers of artists such as Shalamar, The Whispers, Babyface, L.A. Reid and Dr. Dre. Dick Griffey offered to executive-produce Darey's third album which was to break Darey further into the U.S and international markets but unfortunately he died before the project could be completed.

2010–2015: Double Dare

In 2010, Darey performed at high-profile shows in many cities across the World including Nairobi, Johannesburg, Abuja, Lagos and other major African cities, including a special concert with R&B legend R. Kelly in South Africa and the This Day Peace Concert
Tour in the Niger Delta region of Nigeria, which had 50 Cent and Ciara as headliners. On request of the President of Nigeria, Goodluck Ebele Jonathan, he was invited to perform at the presidential villa in an exclusive dinner to commemorate the Country's 50th independence Anniversary. At the event, which was broadcast live to over 200 million viewers across the world, he performed a medley of 50 songs with his 15-piece band, "Soul band" to a room filled with several African presidents and past world leaders.

Darey was the main host of both the Gulder Ultimate Search and Glo Naija Sings reality shows in 2011 and in February 2013, put together alongside his Soul Muzik team one of the biggest shows Nigeria has ever seen, Darey Presents: Love Like A Movie in February 2013 which had the red carpet hosted by Kim Kardashian as well as the highly successful release of the music video, "Asiko" featuring Jozi and Ice Prince.

In May 2013, Darey released a new single, Special Fever, produced by internationally acclaimed producer Harmony. In June 2013, hosted the launch of media mogul Mo Abudu's multi-broadcast network Ebony Life TV alongside Dolapo Oni and most recently signed on as an ambassador to Unilever's popular beverage drink – Lipton.

Darey also became a judge on Nigerian Idol, replacing Jeffrey Daniel.

2013-2016: Darey Presents Love Like A Movie

Love Like A Movie is a groundbreaking, theatrical concert for Valentines Day held annually by Darey. It set the new standard for cutting-edge production in Nigeria.

The first edition of the show was held in 2013. The show was tagged "The Flight of Love" and featured a special appearance from American reality TV star; Kim Kardashian and raised the bar for experiential events in Nigeria.

The second edition of Love Like A Movie was held in 2014. and featured a special performance by Kelly Rowland.

The third edition of Love Like A Movie was held in 2016 and saw the energetic Ciara take to the stage and also lit up the streets of Lagos with an impromptu dance off.

2015: "Naked"

October 2015, Darey released his fifth studio album titled Naked. The 13-track album made up of afrobeat, soul and R&B features collaborations with Asa, YBNL Nation rapper Olamide and multiple Grammy award-winning Soweto Gospel Choir. Ten of the thirteen songs on the album were produced by Oscar Heman-Ackah. There are also production contributions from  Cobhams Asuquo and Vtek and Dare himself.

2018-2019: BAFEST

Darey served as the creative director and also performed at the second biggest festival in Nigeria BAFEST (Born in Africa Festival) in December 2018 and 2019 to rave reviews. The Livespot-produced festival was conceived to retell the African story by showcasing the very best of art, music, film and fashion. The festival had over 50,000 in attendance and broadcast to over 50 million people across Africa.

2019: Livespot X Festival

Darey performed at the Livespot X Festival (produced by Livespot 360) which was held in December 2019 across two African cities Lagos and Accra with Grammy Award winner Cardi B as headline act. The first ever Livespot X Festival in Lagos was the biggest concert in Nigeria with over 60,000 people in attendance. Along with creative directing, hosting and performing at the festival Darey also immersed Cardi B in Nigerian pop culture, showing her around and also paying a philanthropic visit to an orphanage, acting as the entertainment bridge that connects the world to Africa. During her visit, Cardi B adopted a Nigerian name "Chioma" and called herself "Chioma B" on social media which thrilled many of her Nigerian fans.

Jah Guide Me
After being away for nearly five years as an active musician, on August 14, 2020, Darey returned with a gospel-esque single titled "Jah Guide Me". The song was released to a wide-acclaim and was accompanied by a very colourful Afro-futuristic video. Darey described Jah Guide Me as the beginning of a deeply African-rooted story.

Discography

Albums
From Me 2 U (2006)
unDAREYted (2009)
DoubleDare (2011)
Naked (2015)
Way Home (2020)

Singles
Escalade (2006)
Fuji (2006)
With This Woman (2008)
Carry Dey Go (featuring 2Face Idibia) (2008)
Not The Girl (2008)
More  (2009)
No Stars (2009)
Let You Know (2009)
Style Na Style Remix ft. 9ice, Password & Jesse Jagz (2009)
Stroke Me (2009)
The Way You Are (2010)
Don't Let Me Know (2010)
 Ba Ni Ki Di (2010)
 Sisi Eko (2010)
 The Way You Are (Remix) ft Chamillionaire (2011)
 Special Fever (2013)
 Asiko Laiye (Remix) ft Olamide  (2015)
 Pray For Me ft Soweto Gospel Choir (2015)
 Jah Guide Me (2020)

Awards
Won 
Best Male Video "Not The Girl" (2009 Channel O Music Video Awards)
Best R&B Video "Not The Girl" (2009 Channel O Music Video Awards)
Best R&B "Not The Girl" (2009 Nigerian Music Video Awards)
Best Use of Costume "More" (2009 Nigerian Music Video Awards)
Video of the Year "More" (2009 Nigerian Music Video Awards)
Best Music Video of the Year "Not The Girl" (2009 Nigeria Entertainment Awards)
Best R&B Video "Escalade" (2006 Channel O Music Video Awards)
Best Picture / Musical Video "Escalade" (Awards for Musical excellence in Nigeria (A.M.E.N))
Recording of the Year "The Way You Are" (The Headies 2011)
Best R&B Single of the Year "The Way You Are" (The Headies 2011)
Best Male Artiste: Inspirational "Pray For Me" (All Africa Music Award 2015)

Nominated
Best R&B (2009 MTV Music Video Awards)
Best R&B Song "Escalade" (2007 Awards for Musical excellence in Nigeria (A.M.E.N)) 
Best R&B Album "From Me 2 U" (Awards for Musical excellence in Nigeria (A.M.E.N)) 
Best Single Recording "Not The Girl" (2009 Hip Hop World Awards) 
Best Vocal Performance – Male "Not The Girl" (2009 Hip Hop World Awards)
 Best Afro Pop Video "Ba Ni Ki Di" (2011 Nigerian Music Video Awards)
 Best RnB Video "The Way You Are" (2011 Nigerian Music Video Awards)
 Video of the year "The Way You Are" (2011 Nigerian Music Video Awards)
 Best Use of Costumes "Ba Ni Ki Di" (2011 Nigerian Music Video Awards)
 Artist of the Year (The Headies 2011)
 Best R&B Pop Album – Double Dare (2011 The Headies)
 Best Vocal Performance (2011 The Headies)
 MostStylish Artist – Male (FAB Awards 2012)
 Best Use of Costumes "Sisi Eko" (2012 Nigerian Music Video Awards)
 Best Highlife "Sisi Eko" (2012 Nigerian Music Video Awards)
 Music Video of the Year "Sisi Eko" (2013 Nigerian Entertainment Awards)
 Best Male Artiste: Inspirational "Pray For Me" (2015 Africa Music Awards)                                                            RELATIONSHIP

See also
African hip hop
Nigerian hip hop
R&B
Soul music

References

Nigerian rhythm and blues musicians
Nigerian songwriters
Living people
Yoruba musicians
Musicians from Lagos
University of Lagos alumni
21st-century Nigerian singers
Nigerian hip hop singers
The Headies winners
Nigerian music industry executives
Participants in Nigerian reality television series
English-language singers from Nigeria
Yoruba-language singers
1982 births